Shelter is an American Hare Krishna hardcore punk band formed by Youth of Today vocalist Ray Cappo in 1991. Because of the religious Hindu-oriented messages in its lyrics, Shelter's subgenre has been dubbed by some as krishnacore.

Recent history

In 2001, Shelter released the album The Purpose, The Passion. In 2002, with a new drummer and a new guitarist, the band toured Europe and the eastern United States in support of the record, before going on extended hiatus.

In 2005, vocalist Ray Cappo recorded an album titled Eternal, with ten new songs and a remake of the track "In Defense of Reality". The album was released in May 2006 by Good Life Recordings. Cappo also did a European tour with a few Dutch hardcore musicians functioning as his touring band.

Shelter played two reunion shows in 2011: Göteborg, Sweden, on June 16, and Reading, Pennsylvania, on June 26.

The band reunited again for a US tour and a European festival date, with Sammy Siegler on drums, in 2018. Opening acts included Dave Smalley's Don't Sleep on the East Coast and Washington, D.C.-based hardcore band GIVE in the west.

Band members

Original lineup
 Ray Cappo
 Dave Ware
 Todd Knapp
 Tom Capone
 William Knapp

Selected members
 Vic DiCara
 John Porcelly
 Alex Garcia-Rivera
 Roy Mayorga
 Sammy Siegler

Discography
 Perfection of Desire (1990)
 Quest for Certainty (1992)
 Attaining the Supreme (1993)
 Shelter Bhajan (1993)
 Standard Temple Songs (1993)
 Mantra (1995)
 Beyond Planet Earth (1997)
 When 20 Summers Pass (2000)
 The Purpose, The Passion (2001)
 Eternal (2006)

See also
 Animal rights and punk subculture

References

External links
 Shelter at BandToBand.com
 Equal Vision Records artist page

International Society for Krishna Consciousness bands
Hardcore punk groups from New York (state)
Performers of Hindu music
Victory Records artists
Roadrunner Records artists
Revelation Records artists
Equal Vision Records artists
Good Life Recordings artists
End Hits Records artists